Borun Qeshlaq-e Sofla (also Romanized as Borūn Qeshlāq-e Soflá; also known as Borūn Qeshlāq) is a village in Angut-e Sharqi Rural District, Anguti District, Germi County, Ardabil Province, Iran. At the 2006 census, its population was 51, in 10 families.

References 

Towns and villages in Germi County